The Battle of Lewes was one of two main battles of the conflict known as the Second Barons' War. It took place at Lewes in Sussex, on 14 May 1264. It marked the high point of the career of Simon de Montfort, 6th Earl of Leicester, and made him the "uncrowned King of England". Henry III left the safety of Lewes Castle and St. Pancras Priory to engage the barons in battle and was initially successful, his son Prince Edward routing part of the baronial army with a cavalry charge. However, Edward pursued his quarry off the battlefield and left Henry's men exposed. Henry was forced to launch an infantry attack up Offham Hill where he was defeated by the barons' men defending the hilltop. The royalists fled back to the castle and priory and the King was forced to sign the Mise of Lewes, ceding many of his powers to Montfort.

Background 
Henry III was an unpopular monarch due to his autocratic style, displays of favouritism and his refusal to negotiate with his barons. The barons eventually imposed a constitutional reform known as the Provisions of Oxford upon Henry that called for a thrice-yearly meeting led by Simon de Montfort to discuss matters of government. Henry sought to escape the restrictions of the provisions and applied to Louis IX of France to arbitrate in the dispute. Louis agreed with Henry and annulled the provisions. Montfort was angered by this and rebelled against the King along with other barons in the Second Barons' War.

The war was not initially openly fought, each side toured the country to raise support for their army. A series of massacres of Jews in Worcester, London, Canterbury and other cities were conducted by Montfort's allies.

By May the King's force had reached Lewes where they intended to halt for a while to allow reinforcements to reach them. The King encamped at St. Pancras Priory with a force of infantry, but his son, Prince Edward (later King Edward I), commanded the cavalry at Lewes Castle  to the north. De Montfort approached the King with the intention of negotiating a truce or failing that to draw him into open battle. The King rejected the negotiations and de Montfort moved his men from Fletching to Offham Hill, a mile to the north-west of Lewes, in a night march that surprised the royalist forces.

Deployment 
The royalist army was up to twice the size of de Montfort's. Henry held command of the centre, with Prince Edward, William de Valence, 1st Earl of Pembroke, and John de Warenne, 6th Earl of Surrey, on the right; and Richard, 1st Earl of Cornwall, and his son, Henry of Almain, on the left. The barons held the higher ground, overlooking Lewes and had ordered their men to wear white crosses as a distinguishing emblem. De Montfort split his forces into four parts, giving his son, Henry de Montfort command of one quarter; Gilbert de Clare with John FitzJohn and William of Montchensy another; a third portion consisting of Londoners was placed under Nicholas de Segrave whilst de Montfort himself led the fourth quarter with Thomas of Pelveston.

Battle 
The baronial forces commenced the battle with a surprise dawn attack on foragers sent out from the royalist forces. The King then made his move. Edward led a cavalry charge against Segrave's Londoners, placed on the left of the baronial line, that caused them to break and run to the village of Offham. Edward pursued his foe for some four miles, leaving the King unsupported. Henry was forced to launch an attack with his centre and right divisions straight up Offham Hill into the baronial line which awaited them at the defensive. Cornwall's division faltered almost immediately but Henry's men fought on until compelled to retreat by the arrival of de Montfort's men that had been held as the baronial reserve.

The King's men were forced down the hill and into Lewes where they engaged in a fighting retreat to the castle and priory. Edward returned with his weary cavalrymen and launched a counterattack but upon locating his father was persuaded that, with the town ablaze and many of the King's supporters having fled, it was time to accept de Montfort's renewed offer of negotiations. The Earl of Cornwall was captured by the barons when he was unable to reach the safety of the priory and, being discovered in a windmill, was taunted with cries of "Come down, come down, thou wicked miller."

Aftermath 
The King was forced to sign the so-called Mise of Lewes. Though the document has not survived, it is clear that Henry was forced to accept the Provisions of Oxford, while Prince Edward remained a hostage of the barons. This put Montfort in a position of ultimate power, which would last until Prince Edward's escape, and Montfort's subsequent defeat at the Battle of Evesham in August 1265. Following the battle, debts to Jews were cancelled, and the records destroyed; this had been a key war aim.

In 1994, an archaeological survey of the cemetery of St Nicholas Hospital, in Lewes, revealed the remains of bodies that were thought to be combatants from the Battle of Lewes. However, in 2014 it was revealed that some of the skeletons may actually be much older, with a skeleton known as "skeleton 180" being contemporary with the Norman invasion.

Location 
There remains some uncertainty over the location of the battle, with Offham Hill's eastern and lower slopes covered by modern housing. Recently, a new consensus on the location of the main engagement places it on the current location of HMP Lewes. Contemporary sources suggest the initial engagement took place along the approximate lines of what is now Neville Road. The top and southern slopes remain accessible by footpaths across agricultural land, and the ruins of the priory and castle are also open to visitors.

See also
The Song of Lewes

Notes

References 
 
Brooks, Richard (2015) Lewes and Evesham 1264–65; Simon de Montford and the Barons' War. Osprey Campaign Series No. 285. Osprey Publishing. 
Burne, A. H. (1950, reprint 2002) The Battlefields of England London: Penguin 
Carpenter, D. A. (1996) The reign of Henry III, London: Hambledon 
Prestwich, Michael (1988) Edward I, London: Methuen London 
 
Maddicott, J. R. (1994) Simon de Montfort, Cambridge: Cambridge University Press

External links
 A Lewes 750th anniversary web site
 A map and timeline of the battle

1264 in England
Lewes
History of East Sussex
Lewes
Lewes
Conflicts in 1264
Henry III of England